Khandikar railway station is a railway station on Rangiya–Murkongselek section under Rangiya railway division of Northeast Frontier Railway zone. This railway station is situated at Murara, Khandikar in Baksa district in the Indian state of Assam.

References

Railway stations in Baksa district
Rangiya railway division